The Lohmann Affair or Phoebus Affair was a scandal in the German Weimar Republic in 1927, where a secret rearmament program was uncovered during bankruptcy proceedings of the Phoebus Film AG production company. In addition to the dismissal of both Vice Admiral Walter Lohmann on 19 January 1928 and Reichsmarine Chief Hans Zenker on 30 September 1928, it also led Reichswehr Minister Otto Gessler to resign.

Secret Rearmament

In early 1923 Captain Walter Lohmann, who had acquired international business experience, gained command of the Navy's Maritime Transport Department in October 1920, whose primary responsibility was logistical matters. With full confidence and trust of naval Chief Admiral Paul Behncke, Lohmann was transferred to managing naval black funds generally used for covert funding. Initially, proceeds of about 100 million gold marks were garnered from the illegal sale of ships and submarines intended for scrapping in 1919 and 1920 under Treaty of Versailles requirements. In addition, Ruhr Funds submitted by the Cabinet without Parliament knowledge were added to the fund, of which a portion, 12 million German gold marks, were intended to prepare the marines for military resistance in the Occupation of the Ruhr crisis. Defense Minister Otto Gessler wrote in his memoirs:

Ruhr fund monies were used mainly for secret weapons sales, especially in Italy, and to build a tanker fleet. Activities, however, went far beyond that, including:

 Establishing a marine intelligence service, initially to ensure the supply of raw materials.
 Developing a modern submarine (among other things with a bubble-free torpedo, see also German Type II submarine) with the help of secret funds of the Friedrich Krupp Ship Yard in Kiel, the AG Weser in Bremen, the Vulcan Shipyard in Hamburg and Stettin (now Szczecin), and by the Engineers Office for Shipbuilding in The Hague, Netherlands, which was built on the basis of Wilhelm Canaris's mediation from 1926 in Cádiz, Spain.
 Supporting the Heinkel, Dornier Flugzeugwerke and Rohrbach Metall-Flugzeugbau companies in building aeroplanes.
 Purchasing the Caspar Works, which developed "civilian" aircraft whose performance data "coincidentally" resembled those of other countries' military aircraft.
 Severa (seaplane pilot division) to develop aircraft required for Navy pilot training in Norderney and Kiel-Holtenau.
 Travemünde Marina A.G. to develop and maintain speedboats.
 Participating in founding the Neustädter Slip-GmbH as a repair and training company for sport and speed boats.
 Establishing the German High Seasport Association HANSA to promote officers' children for secret reconstruction of the Reichsmarine. 
 Making available the well-equipped yachting school in Neustadt in Holstein to the German High Seasport Association HANSA (today DHH).

Economic Activities

In addition, Lohmann began investing in commercial projects:

 Property speculation
 Purchasing the Berlin Bacon AG, through which he wanted to disrupt the British Speck market to the Danes.
 Purchasing a private-bank-shares bank Berliner Bankverein, the bank through which Lohmann financed all activities.
 Developing an ice rescue process
 Participating in and guarantees for Phoebus Film AG (see below)

Various explanations were given for these non-maritime activities:

 They should be indirectly in the navy's interests, e.g., Berlin Bacon AG's refrigerated vessels could also have been used to carry troops during the war
 They should serve to unobtrusively build an agent network
 They should conceal secret project financing 
 They should replace the lack of funds inflow through their economic success

Lohmann, on the other hand, received explanations of honour from all sides, that he had not personally enriched himself. But he was also told that he had been a friend of the Phoebus Director Ernst Hugo Correll and had given his girlfriend Else Ektimov (or Elke Ekimoff) a 12-room apartment and a well-paid job at Phoebus.

Lohmann had been involved with Phoebus Film AG since 1924. In addition to high returns, he also aimed to place inconspicuous agents in Phoebus's offices abroad. When Phoebus ran into trouble, he obtained credit for it from the Girozentrale. He received the signature for the required guarantee only on presenting a further guarantee from the parent company, Lignose AG , which had priority. On the other hand, he assured Lignose that in the name of the empire it was not liable for this guarantee. Later, he signed his own self-sufficient guarantees.

In August, when bankruptcy no longer could be averted, the financing arrangement collapsed.

Exposé

Kurd Wenkel, an economic journalist of the Berlin daily newspaper, had wondered since mid-July 1927, how the company, through inflows, could delay its collapse for so long. After a former Phoebus employee informed him about the Lohmann investments, Wenkel publicly published the scandal in articles on August 8 and 9. He likely was unaware of the real background, but suspected that the state in the national sense must have influenced the program and the Phoebus rental policy, which was not quite unjustified, because in Phoebus' shallow program (one does not participate out of love), a few nautical injections were noticeable (i.e., the northbound journey of German warships).

The government under Reichskanzler Wilhelm Marx tried to limit the damage. The Wenkel articles were removed from publication under threat of prosecution for treason. The remote economic activities were portrayed as the work of a subordinate official, and the Phoebus scandal became the Lohmann affair. The secret rearmament activities, and thus the breach of the Treaty of Versailles, could be hushed up. Although the Reichstag's Kommunistische Partei Deutschlands (KPD) Deputy Ernst Schneller asked very precisely for details of the upgrade program, he was ignored.

The Reichstag approved 26 million RM to settle the affair only after resignation of Reichswehrminister Otto Gessler on January 19, 1928. On 30 September, Gessler's successor Wilhelm Groener, dismissed the chief of the Reichsmarine, Admiral Hans Zenker, Lohmann's direct superintendent. Lohmann himself was retired when his pension was cut, but he was never prosecuted, because to uncover the affair's true background would have been too great a risk. Completely impoverished, Lohmann died three years later of a heart attack.

The secret rearmament was not halted but rather extended, subject to the Court of Auditors' independent and secret control. The naval intelligence service was merged into the Army defense command in 1928. The Severa was taken over by Lufthansa as a coastal flight, although it already had a sea-flight department. (see Lufthansa's history)

Other Revelations

When funds to build an officer school in Friedrichsort, near Kiel, were applied for in the republic's supplementary budget of 1926, the parliamentary deputy, during Parliamentary debate, came to conclude that the school had been built already and had been inaugurated by Hans Zenker, the head of the naval leadership,. The Sozialdemokratische Partei Deutschlands (SPD) suspected black coffers and demanded that army and navy resources should be limited to their allotted budgets and be monitored more closely.

In 1929, an article appeared on the world stage in the magazine Die Weltbühne about the German aviation industry, which revealed individual details of the continued secret armoury. Both the author Walter Kreiser (pseudonym: Heinz Jäger) and the publisher Carl von Ossietzky were condemned to 18 months imprisonment for the treason of exposing military secrets.

Literature
 CIA-Report: The Lohmann Affair. Studies in Intelligence 4, Heft 2 (Spring 1960): A31-A38. RG059 30. January 2010 aufgerufen. 
 Files of the Reich Chancellery regarding Walter Lohmann obtained from the German Federal Archives 13. February 2017.
 Otto Gessler : Reichswehr politics in the Weimar period. Hrsg. v. Kurt Sendtner, Stuttgart 1958.
 Francis L. Carsten: Reichswehr and policy, 1918–1933, Köln 1964.
 Bernd Remmele: The maritime secret armament under Captain z.S. Lohmann. In: Military-historical releases 56, 1997, S. 313–376.
 E.S.: The Phoebus scandal. In: The International, 11, Heft 7 (1. April 1928), S. 193 ff. Reprint: The International 9, Neue Kritik KG Frankfurt, 1972, .
 Heinz Jäger: Windiges aus der Deutschen Luftfahrt. In: Die Weltbühne 11, 1929.
 Wilhelm Th. Wulff "Tierkreis und Hakenkreuz" Gütersloh 1968 Ss.78 - 101 Kapitel "Kapitän Lohmann und der Phoebus-Filmskandal."

References

Scandals in Germany
1927 scandals
1927 in Germany